Ali al-Khudair (also known as Ali bin al-Khudair, or Ali bin al-Khudayr)  is a Saudi Arabian thinker and scholar. He was arrested in 2003. He has been called a member of the  “al-Shu’aybi school”, named after his teacher, Hamoud al-Aqla al-Shuebi.

Before his 2003 arrest

Ali al-Khudair had issued fatwas against several Saudi-Arabian thinkers, among them Turki al-Hamad, Mansour al-Naqeedan and Abdullah Abusamh declaring them as infidel.

His taped sermons and religious decrees are reported to have influenced many young people in Saudi-Arabia.

After the 9/11 attacks on New York and Washington DC,  he issued a fatwa calling on his followers to rejoice in the attacks and listed American "crimes" that justified the attacks "killing and displacing Muslims, aiding the Muslims' enemies against them, spreading secularism, forcefully imposing blasphemy on peoples and states, and persecuting the mujahideen."

Arrest, 2003, and afterwards
He was arrested in May 2003 in Madinah, Saudi-Arabia following the May 2003 suicide bombings of residential compounds in Riyadh that killed 34 people. According to Ain-al-Yaqeen he was one of three scholars who had issuing a fatwa `that declared the killing of security personnel during confrontations "halal" or permissible.` Two other scholars arrested were Nasser al-Fahd, and Ahmad Al-Khaledi.

Days after his arrest, an Islamist Web site posted a message from Osama bin Laden warning the Saudi government not to harm the cleric. Bin Laden described al-Khudair as "our most prominent supporter" and according to Mohamad Bazzi, cautioned that if he was hurt, Al-Qaeda's response would be "as great as the sheik's high standing with us". 

According to Ain-al-Yaqeen, in November 2003 interview with Saudi television, al-Khudair 
"recanted and condemned the suicide bombings which took place in Riyadh" and withdrew 
the fatwas he had issued declaring Turki al-Hamad, Mansour al-Naqeedan and Abdullah Abusamh infidels, which was later proven to be false..

References

Saudi Arabian Islamists
Saudi Arabian Sunni Muslim scholars of Islam
Saudi Arabian prisoners and detainees
Living people
Critics of Shia Islam
Year of birth missing (living people)